Eduard Matasek (1867–1912) was a noted Austro-Hungarian architect, best known for his Sha'ar Hashamayim Synagogue in Cairo. Himself a Roman Catholic, he designed it together with his (Jewish) partner Maurice Youssef Cattaui.

References

Austro-Hungarian architects
1867 births
1912 deaths